The Mystery Maker was a Canadian children's drama television series, which aired on CBC Television in 1967.

Plot
The plot is set in Stratford, Ontario at a boarding house owned by Mrs. O'Hara (Ruth Springford), a widow. Her teen-aged daughter Pegeen (Kathy Kastner) was an aspiring actress. Each episode featured elements of mystery involving the O'Hara's and residents of the boarding house.

Cast
 Kathy Kastner as Pegeen O'Hara
 Ruth Springford as Mrs. O'Hara
 James Edmond as Mr. Pudd
 Frances Hyland as a boarding house employee
 Syme Jago as Andy
 Alan Jordan
 Beth Lockerbie as Mrs. Hodge
 Jane Mallett
 Miles MacNamara as David
 Charles Palmer as Mr. Toby
 Joseph Shaw as Mr. B
 Tudi Wiggins

Production
This series was recorded on location in Stratford. Stories were adapted by Lyn Cook from her novel Pegeen and the Pilgrim.

Scheduling
This half-hour series was broadcast on Fridays at 4:30 p.m. (Eastern time) from 6 January to 31 March 1967.

References

External links
 
 

CBC Television original programming
1967 Canadian television series debuts
1967 Canadian television series endings
1960s Canadian children's television series
1960s Canadian drama television series
Television shows filmed in Ontario
Television shows set in Ontario
Culture of Stratford, Ontario